The G56 manual transmission was the last manual transmission available in a full-size pickup truck.  It is also the only manual transmission being optioned in Class-4 and Class-5 trucks.  The transmission uses Mopar ATF+4 transmission fluid.  Ram trucks began running this transmission in the 2005 model-year trucks as a mid-year change to phase out the cast-iron 6-speed New Venture Gear 5600 transmission.

Common applications
2005 - 2018 Ram 2500 trucks
2005 - 2018 Ram 3500 trucks
2008 - 2018 Ram 4500 trucks
2008 - 2018 Ram 5500 trucks
Mercedes-Benz Atego Truck 
Mercedes-Benz Vario 818

References

Automobile transmissions
Pickup trucks